Ali Dahane (born 1967) is a Moroccan sprinter.

Dahane finished seventh in 4 x 400 metres relay at the 1991 World Championships, together with teammates Abdelali Kasbane, Bouchaib Belkaid and Benyounés Lahlou.

External links

1967 births
Living people
Moroccan male sprinters
Place of birth missing (living people)
Mediterranean Games bronze medalists for Morocco
Mediterranean Games medalists in athletics
Athletes (track and field) at the 1991 Mediterranean Games
20th-century Moroccan people
21st-century Moroccan people